The program of the Boy Scouts of America is administered through  local councils, with each council covering a geographic area that may vary from a single city to an entire state. Each council receives an annual charter from the National Council and is usually incorporated as a charitable organization. Most councils are administratively divided into districts that directly serve Scout units.

Councils previously fell into one of four regions: Western, Central, Southern, and Northeast. Each region was then subdivided into areas. The total number of councils depends on how they are counted:

 There are  individual local councils.
 Direct Service covers units outside of local councils. Although technically not a council, it is assigned a council number.
 Greater New York Councils has five boroughs, each with an assigned council number.
 Michigan Crossroads Council has four field service councils, each with an assigned council number.
 Each of the four regions has an assigned council number.

Current councils of the Boy Scouts of America

Organization 

Until 2001, the Boy Scouts of America was divided into four regions for administrative purposes — Central, Southern, Western, and Northeast. Each region was then subdivided into areas. Each region had a volunteer president, assisted by volunteer officers and board members, and the day-to-day work of Scouting was managed by the regional director, assistant and associate regional directors, and area directors. Regions and areas were subdivisions of the National Council and did not have a corporate status separate from the BSA.

Regions were replaced by National Service Territories in June 2021.

Central Region covered the states of Iowa, Illinois, Kansas, Michigan, Minnesota, Missouri, North Dakota, Ohio, Wisconsin, and parts of Indiana, Kentucky, Montana, Nebraska, South Dakota, Virginia, and West Virginia.

Northeast Region covered the northeastern states of Connecticut, Delaware, Maine, Maryland, Massachusetts, New Hampshire, New Jersey, New York, Pennsylvania, Rhode Island, Vermont, and the northern portion of Virginia. It also covered the District of Columbia, Puerto Rico, the Virgin Islands, and the Transatlantic Council.

Southern Region covered all of Alabama, Arkansas, Florida, Georgia, Louisiana, Mississippi, North Carolina, Oklahoma, South Carolina, and Tennessee, and parts of Indiana, Kentucky, Maryland, Texas, Virginia, and West Virginia.

Western Region covered all of Alaska, Arizona, California, Colorado, Hawaii, Idaho, Nevada, New Mexico, Oregon, Utah, Washington, and Wyoming, and parts of Montana, Nebraska, South Dakota, and Texas, as well as the countries of Japan, the Philippines, South Korea, Taiwan, and Thailand.

Further reading

See also
 Local councils of the Boy Scouts of America
 Local council camps of the Boy Scouts of America
 Defunct local councils of the Boy Scouts of America
 List of councils (Girl Scouts of the USA)

External links

References

 
BSA local councils and districts
Scouting-related lists